Satinder is a given name and may refer to:

People 
 Satinder Bhagat, originator of the zero-rupee note
 Satinder Bindra, Canadian television news reporter
 Satinder Kumar Lambah (born 1941), former Indian High Commissioner to Pakistan
 Satinder Kumar Saini, Indian Army officer
 Satinder Sartaaj (born 1982), singer, songwriter, actor, and poet
 Satinder Satti, Indian television anchor, actress, poet, dancer, and singer
 Satinder Singh (born 1987), Indian 400-meter hurdler
 Satinder Singh Noor,  Punjabi poet and critic
 Satinder Vir Kessar (born 1932), Indian synthetic organic chemist